This is a list of lighthouses in Malta.

Lighthouses

See also
Lists of lighthouses and lightvessels

References

External links

 

Lighthouses
Malta
Lighthouses